North Beach is a 2000 American comedy-drama film co-directed by and starring Richard Speight Jr.

Plot

Cast
Casey Peterson as Tyler
Jennifer Milmore as Paige
Gabrielle Anwar as Lu
Jim Hanna as Robbie
Barrow Davis as Veronica 
Hopwood DePree as Ted
Richard Speight Jr. as Pete

Reception
James Brundage of Contactmusic.com gave the film four and a half stars out of five.

References

External links
 
 
 

American romantic comedy-drama films
2000 romantic comedy-drama films
2000 comedy films
2000 films
2000 drama films
2000s English-language films
2000s American films